Governor Carroll may refer to:

Beryl F. Carroll (1860–1939), 20th Governor of Iowa
John Lee Carroll (1830–1911), 37th Governor of Maryland
Julian Carroll (born 1931), 54th Governor of Kentucky
Thomas King Carroll (1793–1873), 21st Governor of Maryland
William Carroll (Tennessee politician) (1788–1844), 5th Governor of Tennessee